Metkei is a Division of Keiyo South Sub-County and a Location in the Elgeyo Marakwet County, Kenya. Metkei has a population of 37,196 (2019 census, total population of the Metkei location) .

Steeplechase runner Jeruto Kiptum was born here.

Populated places in Rift Valley Province
Elgeyo-Marakwet County